Cingulina brazieri is a species of sea snail, a marine gastropod mollusk in the family Pyramidellidae, the pyrams and their allies.

Description
The white shell is smooth, pellucid, and polished. Its length measures 4 mm. The teleoconch contains six whorls that are flattened just below the suture, which is finely, callously margined. The apex is styliform.

Distribution
This marine species occurs off the coasts of New South Wales, Australia, mainly throughout deep areas east of the Sydney Harbour.

References

Pyramidellidae
Gastropods described in 1877